Zia-ul-Hassan is a Pakistani politician who had been a Member of the Provincial Assembly of Sindh, from March 2016 to May 2018.

Early life and education

He was born on 28 July 1974 in Nawabshah.

He has a degree of Bachelor of Arts, a degree of Bachelor of Laws and a degree of Master of Laws, all from Sindh University.

Political career

He was elected to the Provincial Assembly of Sindh as a candidate of Pakistan Peoples Party from Constituency PS-23 NAUSHERO FEROZE-V in by-polls held in March 2016.

References

Living people
Sindh MPAs 2013–2018
1974 births
Pakistan People's Party politicians